Ruptura may refer to:

 Ruptura, a Portuguese student activist movement merged in 2005 with the Frente da Esquerda Revolucionária to form Ruptura/FER
 Ruptura, a Brazilian Concrete Art group, see Lygia Pape